Leticia Burgos Ochoa (born 24 August 1957) is a Mexican politician affiliated with the Party of the Democratic Revolution. As of 2014 she served as Senator of the LVIII and LIX Legislatures of the Mexican Congress representing Sonora.  She also served as Deputy during the LVI Legislature.

References

1957 births
Living people
People from Ciudad Obregón
Politicians from Sonora
Women members of the Senate of the Republic (Mexico)
Members of the Senate of the Republic (Mexico)
Members of the Chamber of Deputies (Mexico)
Party of the Democratic Revolution politicians
20th-century Mexican politicians
20th-century Mexican women politicians
21st-century Mexican politicians
21st-century Mexican women politicians
Women members of the Chamber of Deputies (Mexico)
Universidad de Sonora alumni